Mir Kuh or Mirkuh may refer to:
 Mir Kuh-e Olya
 Mir Kuh-e Sofla
 Mir Kuh-e Vosta